Xyloskenea consors is a species of sea snail, a marine gastropod mollusk, unassigned in the superfamily Seguenzioidea.

Distribution
This marine species occurs off New Zealand.

References

 Marshall B.A. 1988. Skeneidae, Vitrinellidae and Orbitestellidae (Mollusca: Gastropoda) associated with biogenic substrata from bathyal depths off New Zealand and New South Wales. Journal of Natural History, 22(4): 949-1004.

External links
 To World Register of Marine Species

consors
Gastropods described in 1988